This is a partial list of songs that originated in movies that charted (Top 40) in either the United States or the United Kingdom, though frequently the version that charted is not the one found in the film.

Songs are all sourced from, and,.

For information concerning music from James Bond films see

1942

1944

1945

1950

1952

1953

1954

1955

1956

1957

1958

1960

1961

1962

1963

1964

1965

1966

1967

1968

1969

1970

1971

1972

1973

1975

1976

1977

1978

1979

1980

1981

1982

1984

1985

1986

1987

1988

References

Songs written for films
Top 40 songs from films
Top 40 songs from films